Joseph Kizito may refer to:

 Joseph Kizito (footballer), Ugandan footballer
 Joseph Kizito (priest), Ugandan-born Roman Catholic priest and bishop in South Africa